Pro Quarterback is a 1992 multiplatform video game that is based on American football. It was released for both the Super NES and the Sega Genesis video game consoles. A port for the Atari Lynx was announced but never released.

Gameplay
There are 27 unlicensed football teams in this game. Mode 7 was featured in the Super NES version due to its ability to enhance the movement of the football.

The colors of the team's uniforms are almost the same as the uniforms used in the 1992 NFL season, however. Six different surfaces can be used along with quarters ranging from two minutes to a full 15 minutes. The referee call delay of game penalties in the game when the play clock runs out, the only penalty in the game. There is no other penalties in the game, making offsides and roughing the quarterback into workable strategies. Players are notoriously slow in this game; it is possible for six defensive linemen to catch up with the quarterback and sack him before he is ready to make a forward pass. The announcer will call "interception", when a defensive player catches the ball or "fumble", if the ball is loose during a play. A humorous animation is played after an incomplete pass, interception, or fumble during play selection on the scoreboard.

Players are in complete control of both the offense and the defense. However, the number of defensive plays is considerably lower than the number of offensive plays; encouraging players to specialize in offense. The view is always shifted to down the field so that receivers can easily be tracked while the player is controlling the offensive line.

Reception

Reviewing the Genesis version, Mega said that it had "terrible graphics, no life-span, no playability."

References

External links
Pro Quarterback at MobyGames

1992 video games
American football video games
Cancelled Atari Lynx games
North America-exclusive video games
Sega Genesis games
Super Nintendo Entertainment System games
Tradewest games
Multiplayer and single-player video games
Video games developed in the United States